Rayko Nunatak (‘Raykov Nunatak’ \'ray-kov 'nu-na-tak\) is the rocky hill rising to 783 m in the northeast foothills of Detroit Plateau on southern Trinity Peninsula in Graham Land, Antarctica, surmounting Diplock Glacier to the north and Zavera Snowfield to the southeast.

The peak is named after the Bulgarian poet Rayko Zhinzifov (1839–1877).

Location

Maps
 Antarctic Digital Database (ADD). Scale 1:250000 topographic map of Antarctica. Scientific Committee on Antarctic Research (SCAR). Since 1993, regularly upgraded and updated.

Notes

References
 Rayko Nunatak. SCAR Composite Antarctic Gazetteer
 Bulgarian Antarctic Gazetteer. Antarctic Place-names Commission. (details in Bulgarian, basic data in English)

External links
 Rayko Nunatak. Copernix satellite image

Nunataks of Trinity Peninsula
Bulgaria and the Antarctic